Eugenio Galvalisi (15 November 1915 – 9 December 2000) was a Uruguayan footballer. He played in four matches for the Uruguay national football team from 1935 to 1937. He was also part of Uruguay's squad for the 1937 South American Championship.

References

External links
 
 

1915 births
2000 deaths
Uruguayan footballers
Uruguay international footballers
Place of birth missing
Association football midfielders
Uruguayan football managers
Liverpool F.C. (Montevideo) managers
Rampla Juniors players
Club Nacional de Football players
Defensor Sporting players